Ned Lander is an Australian film producer, director and former head of SBS Independent from Adelaide, South Australia.

He has produced or commissioned many culturally significant programs, including the animated children's series Little J and Big Cuz (2017), Last Cab to Darwin (2015) and Radiance (1998).

He is also known for directing Wrong Side of the Road (1981), a drama-documentary about Aboriginal musicians which won the Jury Prize at the Australian Film Institute Awards, and 50 Years of Silence (1994), which won the AACTA award for Best Documentary.

Filmography

References

External links

Australian film producers
Australian film directors
Living people
1956 births